Vjeran Simunić (born 26 April 1953) is Croatian professional football manager and former player who is the manager of Treća HNL club NK Vodice. He holds the Croatian record for number of managed teams. Vodice is Simunić's 37th club.

Playing career
Simunić started his playing career in Hajduk Split in the 1970s. He did not get too many chances in Hajduk as the competition was very big at the time. After Hajduk, his next station was HNK Šibenik, then Dinamo Vinkovci and NK Zagreb, where he spent most of the playing career. In 1982 he made transfer to Sporting Lisabon. After one season he moved to Japan. He was first European player to play in Japan. The club was Tokyo Verdy. After two more challenges in Italy, he returned to native country. He finished his playing career in Bosnia and Herzegovina, with NK Posušje.

Managerial career
Simunić started his rich managerial career in Lipik, in 1994. Then he changed a couple of Croatian clubs before moving to Bahrain. However, he could not stay too much abroad, and he returned to Croatia, starting impressive row of 13 Croatian clubs, interrupted by 3 Bosnian clubs (Posušje, Zrinjski Mostar and Čelik Zenica) in 8 years. He said that his mission is to improve table situation of every club he takes, and in most cases he did that. That is why he had so many offers. Searching for new challenge, he moved to Asia, this time Brunei. He managed club DPMM, soon after his good results with that club made him coach of the Brunei national team. He was very popular, had lot of fans in country and even got Happy Birthday song chanted by fans during one match. But, he suddenly returned to Croatia, and took manager chair of NK Imotski, where he stayed for only one month. Then he took NK Mosor once again but left that club also, and after one half-season.  He took Croatian second division club NK Međimurje, at the start of 2010–11 season.

He returned to coach Brunei's only professional club DPMM FC in 2012 after FIFA allowed it to rejoin S.League after 20 months of suspension due to government interference in Football Association of Brunei Darussalam. Simunić lead Brunei DPMM FC to a successful season in 2012 S.League as he guided them to win 2012 Singapore League Cup and finished second in the 2012 S.League after two seasons without competitive football. Simunić was named as Coach of the Year at S.League Awards Night for his achievement in 2012 S.League.

In January 2013, Simunić was appointed as the Brunei national football team head coach.

On 16 September 2014, Simunić was appointed as the head coach and technical director of Perak FA on a two-year contract, but after only two months he was replaced with M. Karathu before the season even started. Simunić were reassigned to youth development academy of Perak FA. Eventually however, in August 2015, he was reappointed as the head coach of Perak after Karathu were relieved of his position in July 2015 due to poor performances of Perak in the league.

He was released by Perak at the end of unsuccessful Malaysia Cup 2015 campaign, and subsequently joined another Malaysian team, Sabah FA, on December the same year. He only hold the post as the head coach of Sabah until June 2016, when he stepped down following unsatisfactory performances by the team during his tenure.

After Sabah, Simunić returned to manage Zadar. After Zadar, he managed Solin, Bosnian club Vitez and Zagora Unešić.

Since 21 September 2020, Simunić has been managing Croatian third division club NK Vodice.

Personal life
Simunić is married, and has two sons and one granddaughter and grandson. He speaks a few foreign languages – Spanish, German, Italian and English particularly well. An interesting fact is that he also finished college.

Honours

Manager
Posušje
First League of Herzeg-Bosnia: 1999–2000

DPMM 
Singapore League Cup: 2009, 2012

References

External links
 
glasdalmacije.hr
slobodnadalmacija.hr

1953 births
Living people
Footballers from Split, Croatia
Association football goalkeepers
Yugoslav footballers
HNK Hajduk Split players
HNK Šibenik players
HNK Cibalia players
NK Zagreb players
Sporting CP footballers
Tokyo Verdy players
U.S. Catanzaro 1929 players
Vigor Lamezia players
HŠK Posušje players
NK Mosor players
Yugoslav First League players
Japan Soccer League players
Yugoslav expatriate footballers
Expatriate footballers in Portugal
Expatriate footballers in Japan
Yugoslav expatriate sportspeople in Japan
Expatriate footballers in Italy
Yugoslav expatriate sportspeople in Italy
Croatian football managers
East Riffa Club managers
RNK Split managers
NK Mosor managers
HŠK Posušje managers
HŠK Zrinjski managers
NK Hrvatski Dragovoljac managers
NK Kamen Ingrad managers
NK Zadar managers
HNK Cibalia managers
HNK Segesta managers
NK Čelik Zenica managers
NK Marsonia managers
NK Dugopolje managers
NK Imotski managers
DPMM FC managers
Brunei national football team managers
NK Međimurje managers
Perak F.C. managers
Sabah F.C. (Malaysia) managers
NK Solin managers
NK Vitez managers
Premier League of Bosnia and Herzegovina managers
Singapore Premier League head coaches
Croatian expatriate football managers
Expatriate football managers in Bahrain
Croatian expatriate sportspeople in Bahrain
Expatriate football managers in Bosnia and Herzegovina
Croatian expatriate sportspeople in Bosnia and Herzegovina
Expatriate football managers in Brunei
Croatian expatriate sportspeople in Brunei
Expatriate football managers in Vietnam
Croatian expatriate sportspeople in Vietnam
Expatriate football managers in Malaysia
Croatian expatriate sportspeople in Malaysia
Croatian expatriate sportspeople in Portugal